Ai no Uta (愛のうた / Song of Love) is the 37th single released by Japanese pop singer-songwriter Kumi Koda. The single was released in CD and CD+DVD, with limited editions carrying the "Urban Kiss Version" of Ai no Uta. The single was released on September 12, 2007, and followed the theme of Yume no Uta/Futari de... as an autumn/winter-time love ballad. It charted at No. 2 on Oricon and stayed on the charts for twenty-two weeks.

Information
Ai no Uta is Japanese pop singer-songwriter Kumi Koda's thirty-seventh single released under the Avex sub-label Rhythm Zone. It charted at No. 2 on the Oricon Singles Charts and remained on the charts for twenty-two weeks. It was released in September 2007 and continued the theme of an autumn/winter-time love song, such as she did with Yume no Uta/Futari de... the year prior during her Black Cherry era.

The single was released in both CD and CD+DVD editions, with limited editions of each. Limited editions contained one bonus track: a remix of "Ai no Uta."

The title track has been described as a song about the sadness of fleeting love and how fragile and precious it is. The b-side, "Come Over," was the theme song used for the World Judo 2007 (世界柔道2007 / Sekai Judo 2007).

"Ai no Uta" was certified by the RIAJ as being downloaded as a ringtone more than one million times, and as a full-length download to cellphones more than 750,000 times.

Music video
The music video of "Ai no Uta" carried a theme of a woman in love, but left broken hearted by her lover. A ring is used to symbolize the fragility of love, showing her saddened when he lover ignores her adoration of a ring in the window to a jewellery shop.

The video has been described as her "most stunning," with Kumi in a room surrounded by teardrop crystals.

An alternate version of the music video was placed on her corresponding album, Kingdom.

Track listing

Charts 
Oricon Sales Chart (Japan)

Alternate Versions
Ai no Uta
Ai no Uta: Found on the single (2007) and corresponding album Kingdom (2008)
Ai no Uta [URBAN KISS Version]: Found on the single (2007)
Ai no Uta [Instrumental]: Found on the single (2007)
Ai no Uta [The Standard Club PIANO DANCE Remix]: Found on Koda Kumi Driving Hit's (2009)
Ai no Uta [JAXX DA FISHWORKS Remix]: Found on Koda Kumi Driving Hit's 7 (2017)

Come Over
Come Over: Found on the single (2007)
Come Over [Instrumental]: Found on the single (2007)
Come Over [Caramel Pod Club Mix]: Found on Koda Kumi Driving Hit's (2009)

References

2007 singles
2007 songs
Koda Kumi songs
Rhythm Zone singles
Songs written by Koda Kumi